Antitrisuloides is a genus of moths of the family Noctuidae.

Species
Antitrisuloides catocalina (Moore, 1882) (India)
Antitrisuloides siamensis Behounek & Kononenko, 2011 (Thailand)

References

 ; ;  2011: A revision of the genus Trisuloides Butler, 1881 with descriptions of three new species from China (Lepidoptera, Noctuidae). Revision of Pantheinae, contribution I. Zootaxa, 3069: 1–25. Preview

Pantheinae